Laimdota is a feminine Latvian given name, borne by over 600 individuals in Latvia. Its name day is February 11.

People with the name Laimdota
Laimdota Straujuma (born 1951), Prime Minister of Latvia 2014–2015
Laimdota Zizmare, Research Scientist
Laimdota Kalniņa, Research Scientist

In fiction
In literature and culture, Laimdota may refer to:
The maiden Laimdota in the epic poem Lāčplēsis, by Andrejs Pumpurs 
The character Laimdota in the rock opera Lāčplēsis, by Māra Zālīte and Zigmārs Liepiņš

References

Latvian feminine given names
Feminine given names